Yim Si-wan (born on December 1, 1988), known mononymously as Siwan, is a South Korean singer and actor. He is a member of the South Korean boy band ZE:A and its sub-group ZE:A Five. As an actor, he is best known for starring in the films The Attorney (2013), and the cable series Misaeng: Incomplete Life (2014), which were both successful at the box office and in the ratings.

Early life
Yim Si-wan was born on December 1, 1988, in Busan, South Korea. He attended Busan Gudeok High School, Busan National University, University of East Broadcasting Arts, and is currently studying at Woosong Information College. He legally changed his first name from Woong-jae to Si-wan before his debut.

Career

ZE:A

While he was attending the Chin Chin Song Festival in Busan, Star Empire recruited him as a trainee. He entered a nine-member group called "Children of Empire", where he trained for three years. In 2009, the group started doing guerrilla performances around the country. On January 7, 2010, the group debuted with their EP, Nativity under the name ZE:A. He is also a member of the sub-unit, ZE:A-Five.

Acting
Yim joined the cast of the period drama Moon Embracing the Sun (2012), playing the young version of Heo Yeom. Moon surpassed 40% ratings and gained "national drama" status, launching Yim to fame. Later that year, Yim was cast in the revenge drama Man from the Equator, playing a cold young man with a sad story behind his negative outlook on life. This was followed by the sitcom Standby (2012) and Drama Special Waiting for Love (2013). 

In 2013, he starred in the courtroom drama film The Attorney, playing a young student activist detained and tortured by the police on accusations of being a communist sympathizer. The film was a critical and commercial success, selling more than 11 million tickets to become the 8th best-selling Korean film of all time. Yim won Best New Actor at the Max Movie Awards and the Marie Claire Film Festival.

Yim returned to television in 2014 and starred in two drama series. In Triangle, he played the youngest of three brothers separated at childhood, who grew up in a cold chaebol household. While in the webtoon adaptation and cable hit drama Misaeng: Incomplete Life, he reprised his role in Incomplete Life: Prequel as a former baduk player who learns to adapt to Korean corporate culture. Misaeng: Incomplete Life was a commercial hit, recorded high viewership ratings with a peak of 8.4%; and was dubbed a "cultural phenomenon". Im won the Excellence Award in acting at the 4th APAN Star Awards for his performance, as well as Best New Actor awards at the 9th Cable TV Broadcasting Awards and the 51st Baeksang Arts Awards.

Yim then took on his first big-screen leading role in the war drama film A Melody to Remember (2016), playing a good-hearted soldier who is hoping for a miracle even in a desperate situation.
He was also cast in the Chinese-South Korean web drama My Catman alongside Chae Soo-bin and Kim Myung-soo.

In a departure from his usual "nice guy" roles, Yim plays a cunning conman in the crime caper movie One Line (2017). He deviated even farther from his clean-cut image in The Merciless (2017), a crime action film where he played an undercover cop who works for a drug-smuggling ring. Yim was invited to the Cannes Film Festival for the first time. The same year, Yim starred in the historical melodrama The King in Love, playing an ambitious crown prince.

In 2019, Yim was cast in the thriller drama Hell Is Other People, based on the webtoon of the same name. This marks his first project after enlistment. The same year, he was cast in the period sports film Boston 1947. In 2020, he was also cast in the disaster film Emergency Declaration.

In 2020, Yim starred in JTBC’s romance drama Run On, alongside Shin Se-kyung, Kang Tae-oh, and Choi Soo-young.

In 2022, Yim starred in the thriller drama Tracer,  which aired on Wavve and MBC simultaneously, and will appear in the ENA drama Summer Strike.

In 2023, Yim will hold a fan concert called YIM Si wan 2023 'WHY I AM in SEOUL' on February 11th.

Personal life

Military service
On July 11, 2017, he officially began his mandatory military service. Yim was chosen to be an assistant instructor for new recruits due to his good performance. Yim was discharged on March 27, 2019.

Philanthropy 
On March 4, 2022, Im donated  million to the Ukrainian Embassy in South Korea. To help Ukrainian victims of Russian invasion, he also booked a 4-bed dormitory in Kiiwu (Kyiv) for about a month, from March 7 to April 4 to help Ukrainian war victims.

On August 10, 2022, Im donated  to help those affected by the 2022 South Korean floods through the Hope Bridge Korea Disaster Relief Association.

On February 8, 2023, Im donated  to help 2023 Turkey–Syria earthquake, by donating money through Hope Bridge National Disaster Relief Association.

Discography

Singles

Filmography

Film

Television series

Web series

Television shows

Musical theatre

Ambassadorship
 2012 Honorary Ambassador of Korea Tourism Organization
 2012 Brand Ambassador of Tissot Swatch Group Korea
 2012 Brand Ambassador of Pret-a-Porter Busan (Busan Fashion Week)
 2012 Honorary Ambassador of Woosong University of Informatics
 2013 Brand Youth Ambassador of Gyeonggi Province 
 2014 High Ambassador of Korea International Trade Association 
 2014 Brand Ambassador of FinTech Financial Technology Group Inc
 2023 PR Ambassador for the 2024 World Team Table Tennis Championships in Busan

Awards and nominations

Listicles

Notes

References

External links

 

1988 births
Living people
People from Busan
Male actors from Busan
Musicians from Busan
South Korean pop singers
South Korean male idols
South Korean male television actors
South Korean male film actors
South Korean male web series actors
21st-century South Korean male actors
21st-century South Korean male  singers
Japanese-language singers of South Korea
Best New Actor Paeksang Arts Award (television) winners